"Champagne, Champagne" is a song by Australian recording artist Vanessa Amorosi. The song was released in France only to promote the French comedy film Absolument fabuleux which was an adaptation of the British television comedy series, Absolutely Fabulous.

Track listing
 CD single
 "Champagne, Champagne" (Radio Edit) - 2:58
 "Champagne, Champagne" (Album Version)  - 4:27

Release history

References

2001 singles
Vanessa Amorosi songs
2001 songs
Songs written by Robert Goldman (songwriter)